Water Child is a Canadian drama film, directed by Robert Ménard and released in 1995. The film stars David La Haye as Émile, a mentally handicapped young adult who survives a plane crash, finding himself on an otherwise deserted island with Cendrine (Marie-France Monette), a teenage girl.

The film's cast also includes Gilbert Sicotte, Danielle Proulx and Monique Spaziani.

The film received two Genie Award nominations at the 16th Genie Awards: Best Actor (La Haye) and Best Original Score (Richard Grégoire). La Haye won the award for Best Actor.

References

External links
 

1995 films
1995 drama films
Canadian drama films
Films directed by Robert Ménard
French-language Canadian films
1990s Canadian films